The balancing of rotating bodies is important to avoid vibration. In heavy industrial machines such as gas turbines and electric generators, vibration can cause catastrophic failure, as well as noise and discomfort. In the case of a narrow wheel, balancing simply involves moving the center of gravity to the centre of rotation.  For a system to be in complete balance both force and couple polygons should be close in order to prevent the effect of centrifugal force. It is important to design the machine parts wisely so that the unbalance is reduced up to the minimum possible level or eliminated completely.

Static balance 
Static balance occurs when the centre of gravity of an object is on the axis of rotation. The object can therefore remain stationary, with the axis horizontal, without the application of any braking force. It has no tendency to rotate due to the force of gravity. This is seen in bike wheels where the reflective plate is placed opposite the valve to distribute the centre of mass to the centre of the wheel. Other examples are grindstones, discs or car wheels.  Verifying static balance requires the freedom for the object to rotate with as little friction as possible.

This may be provided with sharp, hardened knife edges, adjusted to be both horizontal and parallel.  Alternatively, a pair of free-running ball bearing races  is substituted for each knife edge, which relaxed the horizontal and parallel requirement.  The object is either axially symmetrical  like a wheel or must be provided with an axle.  It is slowly spun, and when it comes to rest, it will stop at a random position if statically balanced.     If not, an adhesive or clip on weight is securely attached to achieve balance.

Dynamic balance 

A rotating system of mass is in dynamic balance when the rotation does not produce any resultant centrifugal force or couple. The system rotates without requiring the application of any external force or couple, other than that required to support its weight. If a system is initially unbalanced, to avoid the stress upon the bearings caused by the centrifugal couple, counterbalancing weights must be added.

This is seen when a bicycle wheel gets a  buckled rim. The wheel will not rotate to a preferred position but because some rim mass is offset there is a wobbling couple leading to a dynamic vibration.  If the spokes on this  wheel cannot be adjusted to center the rim, an alternative method is used to provide dynamic balance.

To correct dynamic imbalance, there are three requirements: 1) a means of spinning the object       2) a frame to allow the object to vibrate perpendicular to its rotation axis     3)  A means to detect the imbalance, by sensing its vibrating displacement,  vibration velocity or (ideally) its instantaneous acceleration.

If the object is disk-like, weights may be attached near the rim to reduce the sensed vibration. This is called one-plane dynamic balancing. If the object is cylinder or rod-like, it may be preferable to execute two-plane balancing, which holds one end's spin axis steady, while the other end's vibration is reduced. Then the near end is freed to vibrate, while the far end spin axis is fixed, and  vibration is again reduced. In precision work, this two plane measurement may be iterated.

Dynamic balancing was formerly the province of expensive equipment, but users with just occasional need to quench running vibrations may use the built in accelerometers of a smart phone and a spectrum analysis application. See ref 3 for example.     A less tedious means of achieving dynamic balance requires just four measurements.  1) initial imbalance reading    2)   an imbalance reading with a test mass attached on a reference point    3) The test mass moved to 120 degrees ahead  and the imbalance again noted.   4) The test mass finally moved to 120 degrees behind the reference point.     These four readings are sufficient to define the size and position of a final mass to achieve good balance.  Ref 4

For production balancing, the phase of  dynamic vibration is observed with its amplitude. This allows one-shot dynamic balance to be achieved with a single spin,  by adding a mass of internally calculated size in a calculated position. This is the method commonly used to dynamically balance automobile wheels with tire installed by means of clip-on lead (or currently zinc)  'wheel weights'.

Unbalanced systems 

When an unbalanced system is rotating, periodic linear and/or torsional forces are generated which are perpendicular to the axis of rotation. The periodic nature of these forces is commonly experienced as vibration. These off-axis vibration forces may exceed the design limits of individual machine elements, reducing the service life of these parts. For instance, a bearing may be subjected to perpendicular torsion forces that would not occur in a nominally balanced system, or the instantaneous linear forces may exceed the limits of the bearing. Such excessive forces will cause failure in bearings in short time periods. Shafts with unbalanced masses can be bent by the forces and experience fatigue failure.

Under conditions where rotating speed is very high even though the mass is low, as in gas turbines or jet engines, or under conditions where rotating speed is low but the mass is high, as in ship propellers, balance of the rotating system should be highly considered, because it may generate large vibrations and cause failure of the whole system.

References 
3 https://www.instructables.com/Dynamic-Motor-Balancing-with-Sugru-and-an-iPhone/

4 http://www.conradhoffman.com/Balancing.xls
Mechanical vibrations
Torsional vibration